The Trocmii or Trocmi were one of the three ancient tribes of Galatia in central Asia Minor, together with the Tolistobogii and Tectosages, part of the possible Gallic group who moved from Macedonia into Asia Minor in the early third century BCE.
All three tribes were beaten in 189 BCE by the Roman consul Gnaeus Manlius Vulso at the battles of Mt. Olympus and Mt. Magaba.

References

Ancient Galatia
Historical Celtic peoples
Gauls